Natale a Rio (Christmas in Rio) is a 2008 Italian cinepanettone directed by Neri Parenti with Christian De Sica. The film has grossed €24,678,792 in Italy. 
It is the third film starring De Sica without mate Massimo Boldi, his shoulder of honor in these films that make up the saga of Italian "cinepanettoni". In fact, in 2006 they were separated in film roles following a dispute.

Plot 
Fabio Speranza (Fabio de Luigi) has always been in love with his colleague Linda Vita (Michelle Hunziker) but she has never seen in four years despite attempts to Fabio. The latter contact but due to a mistake she believes is her boyfriend (Paolo Conticini), thus creating a series of misunderstandings.
Paolo Berni (Christian De Sica) and Mario Patani (Massimo Ghini), are two divorced, and they have organized a luxurious vacation in Rio de Janeiro for the Christmas holidays. They ignore, however, that their sons Piero (Ludovico Fremont) and Marco (Emanuele Propizio) have booked a trip for the same low-cost destination. For a problem of homonymy between fathers and sons, the two holidays are exchanged, however, so while their sons enjoy in luxurious villas, fathers end up into a comic wandering. Paolo and Mario understand that there was a mistake and try by every means to regain possession of their holiday.

Cast 
 Christian De Sica: Paolo Berni
 Michelle Hunziker: Linda Vita
 Fabio De Luigi: Fabio Speranza
 Massimo Ghini: Mario Patani
 Ludovico Fremont: Piero Berni
 Paolo Conticini: Gianni Corsi
 Emanuele Propizio: Marco Patani
 Paolo Ruffini: Holidays agent
 Neri Parenti: cameo
Nanda Andrade:Padilha 
Raquel Vilar: Prepuzia

See also
 List of Christmas films

References

External links

2000s Italian-language films
Italian Christmas comedy films
Films directed by Neri Parenti
Films scored by Bruno Zambrini
2000s Christmas comedy films
Brazilian Christmas comedy films